Pospelikhinsky (masculine), Pospelikhinskaya (feminine), or Pospelikinskoye (neuter) may refer to:
Pospelikhinsky District, a district of Altai Krai, Russia
Pospelikhinsky (rural locality), a rural locality (a settlement) in Altai Krai, Russia